The Public Finance Balance of Smoking in the Czech Republic was a 2001 report commissioned by Philip Morris's Czech division following concerns raised by the Czech health ministry that smoking's costs outweighed its fiscal benefits. The study was conducted by Arthur D. Little and found that smokers' early mortality and cigarette-tax revenue outweighed the costs of health-care and lost tax revenue from early death. The study concluded through cost-benefit analysis "based on up-to-date reliable data and consideration of all relevant contributing factors, the effect of smoking on the public finance balance in the Czech Republic in 1999 was positive, estimated at +5,815 mil. CZK."

The report which was leaked on July 16, 2001, was met with condemnation and subjected Philip Morris to vitriolic criticism from politicians, anti-smoking activists, economists and watchdog groups. Philip Morris subsequently disavowed the report and apologized for its conclusion. A subsequent study by economist Hana Ross demonstrated that smoking deprived the Czech government budget of at least 14,455 mil CZK (or $373 million) annually, thus defeating the "death benefit" argument.

The report was unusual as historically, tobacco companies had disputed the link between smoking and early mortality, whereas the report used early mortality as a selling point. Though similar studies in Europe had been done a decade earlier, Philip Morris stated that it had canceled any new similar reports in countries including Poland, Slovakia, Hungary, and Slovenia. CNN reported that an Arthur D. Little representative had told them that Philip Morris had commissioned similar studies in Canada and the Netherlands, though Philip Morris stated it had no such on-going reports.

The Czech Prime Minister, Miloš Zeman had previously noted the "death benefit" stating that "By smoking, I contribute to the stability of the state budget. By buying cigarettes, I increase state revenues, and I will die of lung cancer, so the state won’t have to pay me a pension." In addition, Zeman had stated that "As a smoker, I support the state budget, because in the Czech Republic we pay tax on tobacco. Also, smokers die sooner, and the state does not need to look after them in their old age."

Report

The stated objective of the report "was to determine whether costs imposed on public finance by smokers are offset by tobacco-related tax contributions and external positive effects of smoking."

Public relations timeline
Following the leak, the company initially defended the report. Philip Morris spokesman Remi Calvert stating that "It is very unfortunate that this is one aspect of the study that is being focused on" adding that "We understand that it appears quite cold, but tobacco is a controversial product." Robert Kaplan, director of communications at Philip Morris International stated that the report's purported death benefit was "just one point" and "was not the point we were emphasizing."

The company subsequently apologized for the report. Kaplan later stated that "We are not in any way suggesting that the social cost of smoking is of benefit to society." Steven Parrish, vice-president at Philip Morris, stating that "We understand that this was not only a terrible mistake, but that it was wrong. To say it's inappropriate is an understatement." In an internal memo, CEO John R. Nelson agreed with critics that the report "exhibited a callous and cynical disregard of basic human values." On July 26, 2001, Phillip Morris issued an apology in the Wall Street Journal:
For one of our tobacco companies to commission this study (AD Little Report concluding that smokers save the state money - by dying early) was not just a terrible mistake, it was wrong. All of us at Philip Morris, no matter where we work, are extremely sorry for this. No one benefits from the very real, serious and significant diseases caused by smoking. We understand the outrage that has been expressed and we sincerely regret this extraordinarily unfortunate incident. We will continue our best efforts to do the right thing in all our business, acknowledging mistakes when we make them and learning from them as we go forward.

The release of the report was viewed as a setback for Philip Morris which had been making charitable donations to improve its public image.

Reaction

Mladá Fronta Dnes described the report as "first-class cynicism and hyena-ism" comparing it to how Nazis determined the value of life in Nazi concentration camps adding "What an offer: `come help us make money on the death of your citizens." The Sarasota Herald-Tribune described the report as "The Philip Morris Health Plan" comparing it to Jonathan Swift's A Modest Proposal.

Following the report, anti-smoking groups placed ads in prominent newspapers such as the New York Times depicting a corpse with a price tag stating "$1,227, [£860] that's how much a study sponsored by Philip Morris said the Czech Republic saves on healthcare, pensions and housing every time a smoker dies".

Academia
 The report is commonly covered as a case study in morality.

Politicians
 On 17 July 2001, U.S. Senator Dianne Feinstein called the report "appalling" and wrote to CEO Geoffry Bible that "by including a cost-benefit analysis of human lives in its calculations, Phillip Morris has stepped well-past the lines of decency and demonstrated, once again, that it conducts business in a manner completely disconnected from any sense of right and wrong.
 Libor Rouček, stated that "It is unbelievable that Philip Morris dares to conduct this study in this country" adding that "It is ethically unacceptable to think and write about human life in those categories."

Watchdogs
 INFACT stated "Even if it were true that smokers dying young would save money for the economy, it's a real scary logic on which to base policy."
 Campaign for Tobacco-Free Kids questioned whether "a responsible, reformed tobacco company tell foreign governments that dead smokers are a good thing for their budgets?"
 Tobacco Products Liability Project stated that "The governments role normally is to protect the health and safety and welfare of their citizens so the idea that somehow or another the government or the state could be benefiting by their citizens dying off would strike anybody who has their conscious reasonably intact as being really quite dreadful."

See also
 Cost-benefit
 Value of life
 The Smoke Screen

References

Books
 
 

Journals

Further reading

External links

 Public Finance Balance of Smoking in the Czech Republic report

2001 in the Czech Republic
2001 documents
Smoking
Smoking in the Czech Republic